The Hijab protests in Azerbaijan are a consequence of changes in the formal and social aspects of Azerbaijan with the banning of the hijab in schools and universities. The hijab ban led to protests by some religious activists and to their subsequent arrests, due to their opposition to the new laws.

Background 
The two main factors in the protests were Azerbaijan's hijab ban and the arrests of religious activists.

Hijab ban in schools 

The Republic of Azerbaijan is a secular state. The hijab was effectively banned in schools by rules defining what kind of uniforms pupils should wear in this mainly Shiite Muslim country, which emerged as one of the most secular in the Islamic world after decades of Soviet rule.

Arrest of religious activists 
The government of Azerbaijan arrested several leaders of the religious opposition and this caused a new round of protest by their supporters which led to them being arrested.
The Parties involved included: the Popular Front, Musavat Party and Islamic Party. Leaders of these parties face long prison terms. Movsum Samadov, leader of the banned Islamic Party of Azerbaijan, was charged with preparing an act of terror.

Protests and further arrests
Anti-government activists used social media to call for street protests inspired by the Arab uprisings on Friday March 11, 2011. Activists inspired by the overthrow of autocrats in Tunisia and Egypt by pro-democracy protests vowed to stage more demonstrations as they were being arrested by police outside Baku's Oil Academy.
Azerbaijan security forces detained 43 people in the event. 

On Saturday the 2nd of April 2011, another protest took place.
Riot police seized protesters near the Fountains Square in Baku, where the opposition had wanted to hold a rally but failed to receive approval from the authorities.
One of the opposition leaders said after the protest that about 1,000 people had taken part and more than 200 were arrested.

On 6 May 2011, some protesters in Baku chanted "God is great" and "Freedom to hijab", before being arrested by the police.

International reactions 
There were international protests against the government's actions.

Europe
 The European Union criticized Azerbaijan for "lack of respect of fundamental freedoms" after the 2 April rally was broken up by security forces. The supranational body called on authorities to allow for freedom of speech, free assembly, and freedom of the press, rights it suggested the government's response disrespected. On 13 April, Azerbaijani Foreign Minister Elmar Mammadyarov summoned the head of the EU delegation to Azerbaijan to express his government's displeasure over the statement.

Iran 
 6 February 2011, Thousands of people and students of girls' schools in Tabriz gathered in front of the Consulate of the Republic of Azerbaijan in Tabriz and announced their protest against the banning of the Islamic hijab in secondary schools of the Republic of Azerbaijan. Participating students announced their support for veiled students of Azerbaijan by chanting Persian and Turkish slogans such as "Prohibition of hijab and covering is a betrayal of the Qur'an", "The statement banning hijab should be canceled", "Muslim student we support you".
 The Iranian Ayatollahs have criticized Azerbaijan's decision to ban the hijab.
 The conference "Opposition to the Hijab Ban in the Republic of Azerbaijan" was held on 2 May 2021 in Jamkaran Mosque.

Human rights organizations
 Amnesty International has also called upon the government to allow peaceful protests. In a letter published in British daily The Guardian on 20 April, its UK affiliate called for the release of Eynulla Fatullayev and other detained journalists and insisted the government should "comply with international standards on human rights – specifically the right to assembly and the right to free expression". The International Press Institute echoed Amnesty's criticisms, condemning the Azerbaijani government's deportation of three Swedish journalists for reporting on the 17 April demonstration in Fountain Square.

Other countries
 United States Ambassador to Azerbaijan Matthew Bryza expressed concern over the Azerbaijani government's response to protests in March 2011.

References

Islam in Azerbaijan